The Bailiffs is a 1932 British comedy film, based on a sketch by Fred Karno and starring Flanagan and Allen, made by Associated Talking Pictures at Ealing Studios.

References

1932 films
British comedy films
Associated Talking Pictures
1932 comedy films
1930s British films